Cichy (feminine: Cicha) is a Polish-language surname, meaning "quiet" or "silent". It is related to several other surnames:

People 
 Jack Cichy (born 1996), American football player
 Joe Cichy (born 1948), American football safety
 Josef Cichy,  (1852–1913), Silesian politician and manufacturer
 Leszek Cichy (1951), Polish mountaineer and entrepreneur
 Marcin Cichy, Polish musician
 Stefan Cichy, Polish Catholic bishop
 Tomasz Cichy (born 1976), Polish field hockey player
 Witold Cichy (born 1948), Polish footballer (defender)
Radovan Cichý (born 1972), Purchasing manager at Tesla

See also
 

Polish-language surnames